Moisés Almeida-Vieites was a lawyer, judicial writer, and Doctor in law from Havana, Cuba.  He was a member of the bar association, and a counselor to both the Centro Gallego, and the Merchants Aid Association in that city.

Bibliography

References

20th-century Cuban lawyers
People from Havana
1881 births
Year of death missing